Candlewood Isle is a census-designated place (CDP) on an island of the same name in Candlewood Lake, in the town of New Fairfield, Fairfield County, Connecticut, United States. It is in the southeast part of the town, with Candlewood Knolls and Kellogg Point on the mainland to the west and Candlewood Lake Club, Candlewood Shores and Candlewood Orchards across the lake to the east.

Candlewood Isle was first listed as a CDP prior to the 2020 census.

References 

Census-designated places in Fairfield County, Connecticut
Census-designated places in Connecticut